Linebarrels of Iron is an anime series adapted from the manga of the same title by Eiichi Shimizu and Tomohiro Shimoguchi. Directed by Masamitsu Hidaka and produced by Gonzo, the season was broadcast on the Tokyo Broadcasting System (TBS) from October 3, 2008 to March 20, 2009. The story centers around Kouichi Hayase, a fourteen-year-old boy living a mediocre life until an accident turns him into the pilot of a gigantic robot called "Linebarrel", as well as lead him to encounter a mysterious girl named Emi Kizaki.

Though the episodes aired first on TBS, Chubu-Nippon Broadcasting (CBC) and Sun Television (Sun-TV) also broadcast the series; CBC aired it within an hour after TBS's initial broadcasts, and Sun-TV aired the episodes a week later. Also, in an agreement, in which Gonzo's corporate parent, the GDH group, decided to allow popular video-sharing websites to stream some of Gonzo's latest anime titles, Crunchyroll, an anime-sharing site, streams episodes of the Linebarrels of Iron anime two hours after its premiere in Japan.

Five pieces of theme music are used for the anime series: one opening theme, two ending themes and two insert songs. An instrumental version of "Kitei no Tsurugi" was also used as an insert song in episode 20. The Ali Project released the "Kitei no Tsurugi" single on November 19, 2008. "Ame ga Furu", Maaya's seventeenth single, was released on October 29, 2008, and "Remedy" was released within Maaya's sixth album, Kazeyomi, on January 14, 2009.

As of June 24, 2009, JVC Entertainment has released a total of seven DVD volumes in Japan, with the first being released on December 24, 2008. The eighth volume was scheduled to be released on July 22, 2009. Each volume contains one disc, with each one containing three episodes, save the first volume, which contains only the first episode. Every volume also contains extras, ranging from Drama CDs to original illustrations by the creator.


Episode list

References 
General
 - Official Japanese episode list

Specific

External links 
 Official site 
 Official Linebarrels of Iron site

Linebarrels of Iron